The Oil Creek Library District is an administrative unit designated by the Pennsylvania Office of Commonwealth Libraries and charged with facilitating and enhancing public library service in Clarion, Venango, and Jefferson Counties.  The District's offices are currently located at the Oil City Library, a public library serving approximately 11,000 people in the city and surrounding areas.

History
The Oil Creek Library District is the successor to the now defunct Clarion Library District.  The District was created in May 1996.

District Services
The Oil Creek Library District provides professional consultation to its member libraries on all issues and topics pertaining to public libraries and the library profession.  Additionally, the District provides Inter-Library Loan Support, Continuing Education opportunities, and shared Electronic Resources to its members.

Library resources
The Oil Creek Library District maintains subscriptions to OverDrive, RBDigital Magazines, Chilton Auto Repair Database, and Tutor.com for the benefit of the patrons at its member libraries.  The District also has a collection of Maker Kits available to libraries for programming.  Additionally, there is an ever growing collection of professional materials.  These materials are available for loan to member librarians and may also be borrowed by the public. The Library District and its member libraries are members of the Access PA statewide library system.

References

External links

 Oil City Library
 Office of Commonwealth Libraries

Public libraries in Pennsylvania
1996 establishments in Pennsylvania
Venango County, Pennsylvania
Oil City, Pennsylvania